Lecture-style instruction or teacher-centred instruction commonly refers to lessons where the teaching activities take place from the front of the classroom. Alternate forms of teaching — referred to as student-centred instruction, participatory learning, or hands-on learning — are group work, solitary work or open learning.

See also 
Active learning
Cooperative learning
Direct instruction
Experiential learning
Social learning (social pedagogy)

Learning methods